Amadeus VII (24 February 1360 – 1 November 1391), known as the Red Count, was Count of Savoy from 1383 to 1391.

Biography

Amadeus was born in Chambéry on 24 February 1360, the son of Count Amadeus VI of Savoy and Bonne of Bourbon. Although he succeeded his father in 1383, he had to share power with his mother.  In 1384, in order to suppress a revolt against his relative Edward of Savoy, Bishop of Sion, Amadeus led an army that attacked and pillaged Sion. In 1388, he acquired territories in eastern Provence and the port city of Nice, thus giving the County of Savoy access to the Mediterranean Sea.

Amadeus died from tetanus on 1 November 1391, as a result of a hunting accident. Upon his death, controversy arose because of his will. Amadeus left the important role of guardian of his son and heir, Amadeus VIII, to his own mother, a sister of the powerful Duke de Bourbon, instead of following the tradition of appointing the child's mother, who was a daughter of the equally powerful Duke de Berry. Due to the dispute between his mother and his wife, rumors that Amadeus had been poisoned emerged soon after his death. It took three months of negotiations to restore peace in the family.

Amadeus was known for his hospitality, for he would entertain people of all stations and never turned a person from his table without a meal.

Marriage and children
Amadeus married Bonne of Berry, daughter of John, Duke of Berry, who was the younger brother of King Charles V of France. They had three children: 
Amadeus VIII, later known as Antipope Felix V, married Mary of Burgundy (1380–1422), daughter of Philip the Bold.
Bonne (d. 1432), married Louis of Piedmont, the final of the Savoy-Achaea Branch.
Joan (d. 1460), married Giangiacomo Paleologo, marquis of Montferrat.

Notes

References
 
 
 

1360 births
1391 deaths
People from Chambéry
14th-century Counts of Savoy
Deaths from tetanus
Burials at Hautecombe Abbey